National Defence (or Defense) University (or College) may refer to:

University
 Marshal Fahim National Defense University, Kabul, Afghanistan
 National Defense University, Baku, Azerbaijan
 People's Liberation Army National Defence University, Beijing, People's Republic of China
 National Defense University, Taoyuan, Republic of China (Taiwan)
 National Defence University, Helsinki, Finland
 National Defence University, Indonesia
 Supreme National Defence University, Tehran, Iran
 National Defense University, Nur-Sultan, Kazakhstan
 National Defence University of Malaysia, Kuala Lumpur, Malaysia
 National Defence University, Pakistan, Islamabad, Pakistan
 National Defence University of Warsaw, Warszawa, Poland
 Carol I National Defence University, Bucharest, Romania
 Korea National Defense University, Nonsan, South Korea
 National Defense University, İstanbul, Turkey
 Ivan Chernyakhovsky National Defense University of Ukraine, Kyiv, Ukraine
 National Defense University, Washington, D.C., United States

College
 National Defence College, Dhaka, Bangladesh
National Defence College, Kenya, Karen, Kenya
National Defense College of the Philippines, Quezon City, Philippines
National Defence College, New Delhi, India
National Defense College (Israel)
National Defence College, Sri Lanka, Colombo, Sri Lanka
National Defence College of Thailand, Bangkok, Thailand
National Defence College, former name of the Joint Service Defence College, UK
National Defense College of Cuba,  Havana, Cuba
National Defence College, Uganda
National Defence College, Nigeria, located in Abuja

See also
NATO Defence College
Royal Military College (disambiguation)
Staff College